Mazatzal Wilderness is a wilderness area of about 390 square miles (1,000 km2) in Yavapai and Gila counties in the U.S. state of Arizona. The wilderness is within the Tonto and Coconino national forests. The town of Payson is to the east, and the Verde River is to the west. During summer, temperatures in the wilderness often exceed 110 °F (43 °C).

The wilderness lies within the following quadrangles of the national topographic map of the United States Geological Survey: Cypress Butte, Table Mountain, Hackberry Mountain, Lion Mountain, Strawberry, Verde Hot Springs, Cane Springs Mountain, Horseshoe Dam, Wet Bottom Mesa, North Peak, and Chalk Mountain.

The flora varies from desert shrubs at the lower elevations to grassland plants to manzanita, shrub live oak, and other mountain shrubs. Scattered pinyon-juniper woodlands, ponderosa pines, and Douglas-fir are found at higher elevations.

About  of trails cross the wilderness.

See also
 List of Arizona Wilderness Areas
 List of U.S. Wilderness Areas
 Wilderness Act

References

Coconino National Forest
Protected areas of Gila County, Arizona
Protected areas of Yavapai County, Arizona
Tonto National Forest
Wilderness areas of Arizona
Protected areas established in 1964
1964 establishments in Arizona